Aldona Klimavičiūtė (born 27 March 1940) is a retired Lithuanian rower who won a silver medal in the eight event at the 1964 European Championships. In 1962 Čiukšytė graduated from the Economics Faculty of Vilnius University. Between 1963 and 1969 she worked as a rowing coach and from 1969 to 2008 as an accountant with the Lithuanian National Symphony Orchestra.

References

1940 births
Living people
Lithuanian female rowers
Soviet female rowers
European Rowing Championships medalists